This is a partial listing of festivals in India.

Related lists

By type
 List of literary festivals in India
 List of Indian classical music festivals

By region

 List of festivals of West Bengal
Festivals in Kolkata
 List of fairs and festivals in Punjab
List of festivals in Maharashtra
List of festivals of Odisha
Fairs and Festivals in Manipur
 :category:Festivals in Tamil Nadu

By culture/religion
 List of Hindu festivals
 List of Hindu festivals in Punjab
 List of festivals in Maharashtra
 List of Sikh festivals
 List of Sindhi festivals

A

 Akshaya Tritiya
 Army Day
 Anant Chaturdashi
 Auda pooja
 Arbaeen
 Ahoi Ashtami

B
 Bhau-beej (Bhai Dooj) bathukamma
 Buddha Purnima/Vesak

C

 Carnival
 Children's Day
 Christmas Day
 Cheti Chand
 Chhath Puja

D

 Diwali (Jainism)
 Dhammachakra Pravartan Day
 Durga Puja (Navratri)
 Dussehra
 Diwali
 Dwijing (Assam)

E

 Engineer's Day
 Eid al-Fitr
 Eid al-Adha
 Vaikuntha Ekadashi
 Easter Sunday
 Elephant Festival

G

 Gandhi Jayanti
 Ganesh Chaturthi
 Ganesh Festival
 Gudi Padwa / Ugadi
 Guru Purnima
 Guru Nanak Jayanti
Good Friday

H 

 Hanuman Jayanti
 Hindi Diwas
 Holi
 Holla Mohalla
 Hornbill Festival
 Haldi Kumkum
 Hazrat Ali's Birthday
 Hanukkah

I

 Independence Day

J

 Janamashtami
 Jivitputrika

K

 Karam
 Kartik Purnima
 Karwa Chauth
 Kumbh Mela
 Kojagiri Poornima
 Krishna Janmashtami
 Kerala School Kalolsavam
 Krishnashtami
 Karnataka Rajyotsava

L 

 Lohri

M 

 Mahavir Janma Kalyanak
 Mahamastakabhisheka
 Maharashtra Day
 Mahashivratri
 Makar Sankranti
 Manusmriti Dahan Din
 Muharram (Ashura)

N 

 Nariyal poornima or Coconut day
 Nuakhai
 Navratri
 National Sports Day
 New Year's Eve

O

 Onam

P

 Parakram Diwas
 Pana Sankranti
 Parents' Worship Day
 Paryushan
 Pitru Paksha
 Pongal
 Pusnâ
 Pola
 Padwa (Diwali)
 Pateti

R

 Ratha-Yatra
 Raksha Bandhan
 Ram Navami
 Ramadan (Roza)
 Rashtriya Ekta Diwas
 Ratha Saptami
 Indian Republic day

T

 Tamil New Year
 Teacher's Day
 Tulsi Vivah
 Tulsi Pujan Diwas
 Thaipusam

U

 Ugadi

V

 Van Mahotsav (Forest Day)
 Vasant Panchami
 Vishwakarma Pooja
 Vishu
 Vivaha Panchami

References

 

India
Entertainment events in India